Jillion Paige Potter (born July 5, 1986) is an American rugby union player. She was the captain of the 2016 USA Olympic women's rugby sevens team.

Childhood 
Jillion Potter Austin, Texas to parents Scott Potter and Vikki Vranich. She has a twin brother Paul Thomas Potter and older sister Molly Potter Grosskopf.

Rugby career 

Potter has played for over a decade including the 2013 Women’s Rugby Sevens World Cup, 2014 Women's Rugby World Cup and 2016 Olympics. She was a recipient of the inaugural Leadership Development Scholarship alongside Ada Milby (Philippines), Samantha Feausi (Hong Kong), Maha Zaoui (Tunisia), Rolande Boro (Burkina Faso), Dr. Araba "Roo" Chintoh (Canada), and Maria Thomas (Trinidad and Tobago). She began her rugby career at the University of New Mexico.

In 2019, she was on the first panel to determine the World Rugby women's-15s player-of-the-year award with Melodie Robinson, Danielle Waterman, Will Greenwood, Liza Burgess, Lynne Cantwell, Fiona Coghlan, Gaëlle Mignot, Stephen Jones, and Karl Te Nana.

Personal life 
She met her wife Carol Fabrizio in 2011, through rugby. She loves flossing her teeth and has her wife carry dental floss with her everywhere. Potter was diagnosed with stage 3 Synovial Sarcoma cancer in 2014 and has since recovered.

References

External links
 Jillion Potter at USA Rugby
 
 
 
 

1986 births
Living people
Female rugby sevens players
American female rugby sevens players
United States international rugby sevens players
Olympic rugby sevens players of the United States
Rugby sevens players at the 2016 Summer Olympics
LGBT people from Texas
American LGBT sportspeople
Lesbian sportswomen
LGBT rugby union players
Sportspeople from Austin, Texas
University of New Mexico alumni
New Mexico Lobos athletes